Alpha-1,2-glucosyltransferase ALG10-B is an enzyme that in humans is encoded by the ALG10B gene. It is a member of the Dolichyl-P-Glc:Glc2Man9GlcNAc2-PP-dolichol alpha-1,2-glucosyltransferase class of enzymes. It has ubiquitous expression in 27 tissues.

References